Magnus Hellström (3 November 1900 – 29 April 1980) was a sailor from Sweden, who represented his country at the 1924 Summer Olympics in Le Havre, France.

References

References
 
 

Swedish male sailors (sport)
Sailors at the 1924 Summer Olympics – 6 Metre
Olympic sailors of Sweden
1900 births
1980 deaths
Sportspeople from Gothenburg
20th-century Swedish people